Saqqez County (Šaharstān-e Saqqez;) is in Kurdistan province, Iran. The capital of the county is the city of Saqqez. At the 2006 census, the county's population was 205,250 in 45,909 households. The following census in 2011 counted 210,820 people in 53,939 households. At the 2016 census, the county's population was 226,451 in 64,384 households.

Administrative divisions

The population history and structural changes of Saqqez County's administrative divisions over three consecutive censuses are shown in the following table. The latest census shows four districts, 11 rural districts, and two cities.

References

 
Counties of Kurdistan Province